Flog It! is a BBC television series that has been broadcast since 27 May 2002, presented by Paul Martin (although the first five episodes were presented by Mark Harnden).

Description
The show follows a similar formula to Antiques Roadshow, with members of the public bringing their antiques to be viewed and valued by a team of experts. However, unlike Antiques Roadshow, the owners are then given the option to sell their items at an auction.

The programme, originally broadcast as part of BBC One's afternoon schedule, subsequently appeared on BBC Two. It is shown as part of the early evening schedule for short runs, and sometimes also on Saturday afternoons. It was noted in early 2017 that Flog It! had recently filmed its 1000th episode.

On 2 October 2018, it was announced by the BBC that they would be axing the show after 17 years as part of a shake-up to "modernise" the daytime schedule.

Objects
During each show, selected lots are auctioned off.

Items by Moorcroft (the factory of William Moorcroft), Clarice Cliff, Troika, René Lalique and Bergmann appear frequently. Previously unrecorded works by artists such as portrait painter Augustus Henry Fox have also been discovered.

In 2013, at Normanby Hall in Lincolnshire, a rare but unrecognised Australian Aboriginal shield was discovered that subsequently sold at auction for £30,000, being purchased by the Sydney Museum.

Experts

On each show, valuations are carried out by two experts and, sometimes, by Martin himself. Experts that have featured on the show include Will Axon, Michael Baggott, David Barby, Kate Bateman, Raj Bisram, Kate Bliss, James Braxton, James Lewis, Anita Manning, Jethro Marles, Adam Partridge, Thomas Plant, Claire Rawle, Natasha Raskin Sharp, Charlie Ross, Philip Serrell, Nigel Smith, Catherine Southon, Mark Stacey, Elizabeth Talbot and Christina Trevanion, some of whom have also appeared as auctioneers in other editions of Flog It! and in other antiques-related BBC programmes such as Bargain Hunt and Cash in the Attic.

Kate Bliss herself presented several editions  2004–2005, when Paul Martin was unavailable.

Locations
Like the Antiques Roadshow, the programme travels around the country. Most episodes include a segment where presenter Paul Martin investigates an aspect of local culture, history or historical figures. The auction usually takes place in an auction house in the same area.

Transmissions

Regular series

Flog It: Trade Secrets

Flog It! Travels Around Britain

References

External links

Flog It: Trade Secrets at BBC programmes
Flog It! Travels Around Britain at BBC programmes

2002 British television series debuts
2020 British television series endings
2010s British television series
Antiques television series
BBC Television shows
Television series by BBC Studios
British reality television series
English-language television shows
Auction television series